Houghton may refer to:

Places

Australia
 Houghton, South Australia, a town near Adelaide
 Houghton Highway, the longest bridge in Australia, between Redcliffe and Brisbane in Queensland
 Houghton Island (Queensland)

Canada
Houghton Township, Ontario, a former township in Norfolk County, Ontario

New Zealand
 Houghton Bay

South Africa
 Houghton Estate, a suburb of Johannesburg

United Kingdom
Hanging Houghton, Northamptonshire
Houghton, Cambridgeshire
Houghton, Cumbria
Houghton, East Riding of Yorkshire
Houghton, Hampshire
Houghton, Norfolk
Houghton Saint Giles, Norfolk
Houghton, Northumberland, a location in the United Kingdom
Houghton, Pembrokeshire
Houghton, West Sussex
Houghton-le-Side, Darlington
Houghton-le-Spring, Sunderland
Houghton Park, Houghton-le-Spring
Houghton Bank, Darlington
Houghton Conquest, Bedfordshire
Houghton on the Hill, Leicestershire
Houghton on the Hill, Norfolk
Houghton Regis, Bedfordshire
New Houghton, Derbyshire
 Little Houghton (disambiguation)
 Great Houghton (disambiguation)

United States
Houghton, Iowa
Houghton, Michigan
Houghton County, Michigan
Houghton Lake, Michigan, an unincorporated community
Houghton Lake (Michigan), a large lake
Houghton Township, Michigan
Houghton, New York
Houghton, South Dakota
Houghton, Washington
Houghton Point, a cape in Wisconsin
Houghton Point, Michigan, an unincorporated community
Many of the places in the U.S. were named after geologist Douglass Houghton.

Buildings
 36 Houghton Drive, a building in Arts and Crafts style in Houghton, Johannesburg
 Houghton Hall, a stately home in Norfolk, England (Walpole seat)
 Houghton Hall, East Riding of Yorkshire, a country house in Yorkshire, England
 Houghton House, a ruined country house in Bedfordshire, England
 Houghton Lodge, a Gothic fishing lodge in Hampshire, England

Other uses
 Houghton (surname)
 Houghton (East Indiaman), five ships
 Houghton College, a Christian liberal arts college in Houghton, New York
 Houghton Elevator, a grain elevator in Clio, Michigan
 Houghton Mifflin Harcourt, an American educational and trade publishing company
 Houghton Winery, a vineyard in Western Australia
 The Houghton family, American business family
 Bev Houghton, fictional character in the Australian soap opera Number 96
 Lurie–Houghton telescope, a catadioptric telescope
 Houghton gooseberry cultivar

See also
 Haughton (disambiguation)
 Hoghton (disambiguation)
Horton (disambiguation)
Horton (surname)